The 1975–76 British Ice Hockey season featured the Northern League for teams from Scotland and the north of England and the Southern League for teams from the rest of England. 

Murrayfield Racers won the Northern League and Streatham Redskins won the Southern League. Ayr Bruins won the Icy Smith Cup.

Northern League

Regular season

(*The Dundee Rockets played all games away for four points per match.)

Southern League

Regular season

Midland Section

Southern Section

Final
Streatham Redskins defeated Altrincham Aces 11:0 on aggregate (9:0, 2:0)

Spring Cup

Final
Fife Flyers defeated the Ayr Bruins

Icy Smith Cup

Second round
Ayr Bruins	bt	Whitley Warriors	7-4
Durham Wasps	bt	Murrayfield Racers	6-5
Fife Flyers	bt	Paisley Mohawks	17-4
Streatham Redskins	bt	Blackpool Seagulls	13-4
Liverpool Leopards	bt	Altrincham Aces	3-0

Quarter finals
Streatham Redskins	bt	Liverpool Leopards	15-5
Ayr Bruins	bt	Durham Wasps	5-4
Fife Flyers	bt	Glasgow Dynamos	10-3
Bristol Redwings	bt	Sobell Saints	7-2

Semi finals
Streatham Redskins	bt	Bristol Redwings	12-4
Ayr Bruins	bt	Fife Flyers	8-1

Final
Ayr Bruins	bt	Streatham Redskins	5-5 & 9-3 (agg 14-8)

Autumn Cup

Fife Flyers won the cup by virtue of a better aggregate score between the two sides. Fife won 13-4 at Kirkcaldy, Durham won 7-4 at Durham giving Fife a 17-11 score.

References

British
1975 in English sport
1976 in English sport
1975 in Scottish sport
1976 in Scottish sport